Playing host to the Eurovision Song Contest 1977, the United Kingdom was expected to, and did, send an entry to the Contest, which was held in Wembley, London.

Before Eurovision

A Song for Europe 1977 
The national final to select the entry, A Song for Europe 1977, was held on 9 March 1977 at the New London Theatre and presented by Terry Wogan. Minutes before the show went live, a strike by BBC cameramen was called, preventing the televised broadcast of the show. The contest went ahead and a few hours later, the audio was aired on BBC Radio 2.

Fourteen regional juries voted on the songs: Bristol, Bangor, Leeds, Norwich, Newcastle, Aberdeen, Birmingham, Manchester, Belfast, Cardiff, Plymouth, Glasgow, Southampton and London. The juries voted internally and then ranked the songs from 1–12, awarding 12 points to the song that received the highest number of votes, 11 points to the second, 10 to the third and so on down to 1 point for their least preferred song. The winning song was "Rock Bottom", written, composed and performed by Lynsey de Paul and Mike Moran. The song says that when people are in a bad situation they should work to solve problems and not be pessimistic about tragedies. Apparently it represents the situation at the time. This was reflected in the unrest surrounding the 1977 Song for Europe and the subsequent Eurovision Song Contest, which was due to take place in Wembley on 2 April. Due to the cameramen's industrial action that spread throughout the BBC, many live broadcasts were affected in the coming weeks and the 1977 Eurovision final was cancelled. On 30 March the strike was resolved and the contest was rescheduled for 7 May.

Final 

Lyn Paul had previously been a member of The New Seekers when they represented the UK at the Eurovision Song Contest 1972, finishing in 2nd place. The band 'Beano' would return to the competition in A Song for Europe 1980 with a change in name to 'Scramble'. Nichola Martin and Ann Shirley were the two female members of the trio 'Rags'. Both women became instrumental in the success of the Eurovision Song Contest 1981 winners Bucks Fizz. Martin herself returned in A Song for Europe 1981 with the group 'Gem' (aka Paris); ironically going up against Bucks Fizz in the competition.

UK Discography 
Mary Mason – What Do You Say To Love?: CBS SCBS5056.
The Foundations – Where Were You When I Needed Your Love?: Summit SU100.
Tony Monopoly – Leave A Little Love: Philips 6006564.
Lyn Paul – If Everybody Loved The Same As You: Pye 7N45678.
High Society – Just For You: Polydor 2058857.
Carl Wayne – A Little Give, A Little Take: Target TGT125.
Lynsey de Paul & Mike Moran – Rock Bottom: Polydor 2058859.
Sweet Sensation – You're My Sweet Sensation: Pye 7N45676.
Val Stokes – Swings And Roundabouts: M.A.M. MAM158.
Beano – Everybody Knows: Decca F13690.
Wesley, Park & Smith – After All This Time: RCA Victor PB5015.
Rags – Promises, Promises: RAK RAK255.
Only the winning song reached the UK singles chart.

At Eurovision
At the Eurovision final, the UK entry was performed ninth in the running order and finished in 2nd place, a record 10th British entry to finish 2nd. The winning song reached No.19 in the UK singles chart, the last chart hit for de Paul, her first in two years. A German version of the song was released as "Für immer". De Paul and Moran did release one further single together, but it failed to chart.

Pete Murray provided the television commentary on BBC 1 and Terry Wogan provided the radio commentary on BBC Radio 2; this would be Wogan's final time he provided the contests commentary for radio, as the following year he began regularly presenting the television coverage. The UK spokesperson was Colin Berry, who would present the UK results for a further 25 editions.

Voting

References

1977
Countries in the Eurovision Song Contest 1977
Eurovision
Eurovision